Sayed Android is an Egyptian animated comedy television series that was shown during Ramadan in 2016. The series stars Mohamed Henedi, Alaa Morsy, Engy Wegdan, Amr Abd Al-Aziz, Eman El-Sayed, and Taher Abu Lela. The series was directed by Sayed Essawy and is his first animated work.

Synopsis
Comic scenes of love, friendship, and enmity play out in a world of anthropomorphic items in cyberspace.

Cast
 Mohamed Henedi
 Alaa Morsy
 Engy Wegdan
 Amr Abd Al-Aziz
 Eman El-Sayed
 Taher Abu Lela
 Tarek Abdel Aziz
 Mohamed Tharwat

Select episode titles
 Episodes 1–2: Web Planet
 Episode 3: The Market
 Episode 4: Al-Zaabeel
 Episode 5: Apache
 Episode 6: Microfilm
 Episode 7: Tiki Taka
 Episode 8: Lie Detector
 Episode 9: The Party
 Episode 10: Depressing Bomb
 Episode 11: Oceans 4
 Episode 12: The Armistice
 Episode 13: The Open Institute
 Episode 14: The Egyptian Monster
 Episode 15: We Don't Want to Talk About the Past
 Episode 16: The Return of the Apache
 Episode 18: Kandy

References

Egyptian animated television series
Egyptian comedy television series
2016 Egyptian television series debuts